Palau XIII Broncos also known as Palau XIII or Palau Broncos are a professional rugby league team based in Palau-del-Vidre in the Occitanie region in the south of France. They currently play in the Elite One Championship which is the top level in France. The club was founded in 1920. They play their matches at the Stade Georges Vaills.

History 
In 1920 Racing Club Palauenc was formed as a rugby club. They were a feeder team for USA Perpignan. Their first silverware arrived in 1928 when they were crowned champion of France's 3rd series. The club switched to Rugby League in 1952 where they competed in the amateur 3rd Division. For such a small club they have a rich history of success. In 1956 they won the 3rd Division title – their first as a Rugby League club.

In 2008 the club completed a league and cup double winning the Paul Dejean Cup and the National Division 1 league, after this success the club took the decision to move up to the semi professional ranks of the Elite Two Championship. After five seasons at this level in which they won the competition three times the club decided to move up to the top tier in 2013, promotion being optional. Despite the small size of the club they are still in the Elite One Championship

The club runs successful youth teams and reserve team through which the club have produced many players top class players including former internationals Jacques Jorda, Julien Touxagas and David Berthezene

Colours and badge
Palau XIII Broncos play in red and yellow in various designs, the Broncos moniker was added following their successful promotion in 2008

Stadium 
Stade Georges Vaills has been the only stadium ever used by the club. The ground is named after a former player of theirs who was born in the area. The ground is situated next to the River Tech and has one main stand. When visiting British clubs are in France to play the Catalans Dragons they frequently use the ground to train on. The ground has hosted two youth Internationals between France and England, on 11 November 2009 France won 22-14 and on 3 June 2011 England won 28-19

Current squad
Squad for 2020-21 Season

Notable players
 Georges Vaills
 Pierre Saboureau
 Michel Vial
 Jacques Jorda
 Pierre Zamora
 Guy Lafforgue
 Jean Claude Touxagas
 Julien Touxagas
 David Berthezene
 Olivier Elima

Honours 
 Elite Two (4): 1993–94, 2009–10, 2011–12, 2012–13
 National Division 1 (1): 2007–8
 2nd Division (3): 1958–59, 1984–85, 1999–2000
 3rd Division (3): 1955–56, 1987–88, 1989–90
 Division Federal (1): 1964–65
 Federal Cup Winners (3): 1984, 2001, 2002
 Paul Dejean Cup Winners (1): 2008

External links 
 http://www.broncos-palau13.com
 http://www.ffr13.fr

References 

1920 establishments in France
French rugby league teams
Rugby clubs established in 1920
Sport in Pyrénées-Orientales